The 2022 Canadian Premier League Final was a soccer match that was the 4th edition of the CPL Finals, the post-season championship of the Canadian Premier League, the top level of Canadian soccer. The match which determined the winner of the 2022 Canadian Premier League season and was played on October 30, 2022, in Ottawa, Ontario. It was contested by Atlético Ottawa and Forge FC, the winners of the league's two semifinal matchups. Pacific FC were the defending champions.

Forge FC defeated Atlético Ottawa 2–0 to claim their third CPL title. Alessandro Hojabrpour scored the opening goal in the 28th minute, which turned out to be the match winner. David Choinière scored in the 78th minute and was named man of the match.

Teams

Path to the Final

The 2022 CPL season was contested by eight teams. Each team played four games against each of the seven opponents for a total of 28 matches. The top-four teams from the regular season qualified for the playoffs which began on October 15, 2022. The first round featured two-legged semifinals where the first-place team from the season faced the fourth, and the second-place team played the third. Atlético Ottawa and Forge FC were the winners and advanced to the CPL Final, a single match to be hosted by the higher-seeded team.

Semifinal results

|}

Atlético Ottawa

Improving on a last place finish in 2021, Atlético Ottawa finished the 2022 season with 49 points, capturing the league's regular season title. They then defeated fourth-ranked Pacific FC in the semifinal by a score of 3–1 to advance to their first Final.

Forge FC

Forge FC competed in their fourth consecutive Final following wins against Cavalry FC in 2019 and HFX Wanderers FC in 2020, as well as a defeat to Pacific FC in the 2021 Final. Forge finished the regular season in second place, two points behind Atlético Ottawa.

Head-to-head
Ottawa and Forge met four times during the season with each team recording one win, one loss, and two draws. The two teams conceded the fewest goals in the CPL in 2022 with Ottawa allowing 29 goals and Forge, 25 goals.

Pre-match
Forge was without their captain Kyle Bekker in the Final because he received a red card in the second leg of the semifinals against rivals Cavalry FC, resulting in a suspension. Forge appealed the suspension and were able to get it reduced to two games; however, Bekker remained ineligible for the Final.

On the Friday prior to the Final, Alexander Achinioti-Jönsson of Forge FC earned CPL Defender of the Year honours, while Atlético Ottawa's Carlos González was named Coach of the Year and Ollie Bassett was named Player of the Year and Players' Player of the Year.

Broadcasting
The CPL Final was broadcast on OneSoccer in Canada and globally. Internationally, the match was broadcast by Fox Sports in the United States, BT Sport in the United Kingdom and Ireland, Flow Sports in the Caribbean, and Hi! Sports TV in Mexico.

Match details

Summary

First half
The match was played in front of a crowd of 14,992 fans at TD Place Stadium. Defender Diego Espejo returned to Atlético Ottawa's lineup after serving a suspension in leg 2 of the semifinals. Forge stuck with their usual 4–3–3 formation, inserting Noah Jensen into the lineup for the suspended Kyle Bekker.

Forge FC began the match on the offensive with Atlético absorbing pressure and looking to counter-attack. Alessandro Hojabrpour opened the scoring for Forge in the 28th minute on a header from a free kick by Tristan Borges, his second goal in as many finals. Atlético began playing more offensively late in the first half seeking to score an equalizer before half time, but were unable to get a shot on goal.

Second half
Forge came out strong to begin the second half with Borges and Aboubacar Sissoko forcing Atlético goalkeeper Nathan Ingham to make a pair of early big saves. In the 75th minute, Sergio Camus came close to scoring an equalizer for Atlético but was denied by Forge goalkeeper Triston Henry.

David Choinière scored a second goal for Forge in the 78th minute to make the score 2–0. While both teams made several tactical substitutions in the later stages of the match, neither team scored any additional goals, resulting in Forge winning 2–0.

Forge held a larger share of ball possession time in the match (55 per cent to 45 per cent) and completed more passes than Atlético (453 to 377). Following the match, the CPL announced that David Choinière was the man of the match.

Details

Post-match
Having made it to four consecutive CPL Finals and having now won three of them, the Canadian Premier League and members of the media declared Forge FC to be a dynasty.

The CPL later named Bobby Smyrniotis as the Manager of the Month for October and David Choinière as the Player of the Month for October for their roles in leading Forge to the championship.

See also
 Canadian Premier League Finals
 2022 Canadian Championship Final

References

Final
Canadian Premier League Final
Sports competitions in Ottawa
2020s in Ottawa